Debatik is a 1961 Albanian drama movie directed by Hysen Hakani. It was produced as a fictional work for the creation of the Debatik organization in Albania in 1942.

Plot
Three years after the Italian invasion of Albania, children create their anti-fascist organization, called Debatik (in English  United Boys Members of Communist Ideas). Coli, an orphaned poor boy, is proud to be accepted in the organization. He manages to inform his communist teacher that he is trapped by the fascist prosecutors, but is killed while doing so. Uncle Demir finds the boy and transports his dead body in his carriage.

Cast
 Shpetim Zani as Coli 
 Dhimitër Pecani as Agimi 
 Pëllumb Dërvishi as Genci
 Sulejman Pitarka as Teacher
 Seit Boshnjaku as Tenente Franco 
 Gjon Karma as Jorgo 
 Lazër Vlashi as Prosecutor
 Sander Prosi as School director 
 Roland Trebicka as Kosta 
 Loro Kovaçi as Drejtori italjan 
 Ndrek Shkjezi as The shop keeper
 Skënder Plasari as Skënderi
 Gjeranqina Osmanlliu as Merushja 
 Besim Levonja as Uncle Lymi
 Benhur Tila as Agroni
 Mario Ashiku as Astiti
 Luigjina Leka as Shpresa
 Qenan Toro as Provocateur
 Tonin Kançi as Captain Bruno
 Violeta Manushi as Agron's mother
 Ilia Shyti as the customer buying fabric for his departed son's coffin.

References

External links
 
 Cuban ICAIC Poster of 1965 of the film Debatik by Raimundo García Parra

1961 films
1961 drama films
Albanian drama films
Albanian World War II films